Vic and Vik are short forms of the given names Victor and Viktor. Notable people and characters with these names include:

 Vik Adhopia, Canadian radio reporter
 Vic Aldridge (1893–1973), American Major League Baseball pitcher
 Vik Armen, (born 1937) stage name of Canadian country music singer and songwriter Bryan Fustukian 
 Vik Barn (born 1995), better known as Vikkstar123, English YouTuber and Internet personality (Vik is not short for Viktor but Vikram)
 Vic Bellamy (born 1963), American football player
 Vic Chesnutt (1964–2009), American singer-songwriter
 Vic Chou (born 1981), Taiwanese actor, singer and commercial model
 Vic Cianca (1918–2010), American police officer
 Vic Damone (1928–2018), American singer and entertainer
 Vic Dana (born 1940), American actor and singer
 Vic Davalillo (born 1936), Venezuelan baseball player
 Vic Dhillon (born 1969), Canadian politician
 Vic Dickenson (1906–1984), African-American jazz trombonist
 Vic Duggan (1910–2007), Australian speedway racer who won the London Riders' Championship in 1947
 Vic Elford (born 1935), English sportscar racing, rallying and Formula One driver
 Vic Fuentes (born 1983), American singer, songwriter and musician
 Vic Godard, British singer-songwriter formerly of the punk group Subway Sect
 Vic Grimes (born 1963), American professional wrestler
 Vic Howe (1929–2015), Canadian professional ice hockey player
 Vic Janowicz (1930–1996), American college and National Football League halfback, member of the College Football Hall of Fame
 Vic Juris (1953–2019), American jazz guitarist
 Vic Kulbitski (1921–1998), American football player
 Vik Lalić (born 1976), Croatian footballer and coach
 Vic Lee (disambiguation), multiple people
 Vic Lewis (1919–2009), British jazz guitarist and bandleader
 Vic Maile (1943–1989), British record producer
 Vic Mignogna (born 1962), American voice actor and musician
 Vic Mizzy (1916–2009), American composer
 Vic Morrow (1929–1982), American actor
 Vik Muniz (born 1961), Brazilian artist and photographer
 Vic Perrin (1916–1989), American actor and voice artist
 Vic Peters (1955–2016), Canadian curler
 Vic Raschi (1919–1988), American baseball pitcher
 Vic Reeves (born 1959), English comedian
 Vic Ross (1900–1974), American lacrosse player
 Vic Rouse (disambiguation), multiple people
 Vic Ruggiero, American musician, songwriter and producer from New York City
 Vik Sahay, Canadian film and television actor
 Vic Seixas (born 1923), American tennis player
 Vik Sharma, British film and television composer
 Vic Snyder (born 1947), American politician from the US state of Arkansas
 Vic Sotto (born 1954), Filipino actor and comedian
 Vic Stasiuk (born 1929), Canadian professional ice hockey left winger
 Vik Edwin Stoll (born 1954), American lawyer from Missouri
 Vic Stollmeyer (1916–1999), West Indian cricketer
 Vic Tanny (1912–1985), American bodybuilder and entrepreneur
 Vic Tayback (1930–1990), American actor
 Vic Toews (born 1952), Canadian politician
 Vic Wunderle (born 1976), American archer

Fictional characters and mascots
 Vic Mackey, an Immigration and Customs Enforcement agent in the crime drama series The Shield
 Vic Rattlehead, mascot of heavy metal band Megadeth
 Vic Romano, character (co-host) of the game show MXC
 Vic Windsor, on the ITV soap opera Emmerdale
 Lady Vic, in the DC Comics universe
 Vic the Demon, mascot of Northwestern State University
 Vic, the title character of the children's TV series Vic the Viking
 Vegas Vic, the unofficial name for the sign of the now-defunct Pioneer Club casino, in Las Vegas
 Vic, a bull villager in the video game series Animal Crossing

See also
 Vik (surname)

Masculine given names
Hypocorisms
English masculine given names